Wallace Edmonds Conkling (October 25, 1896 – August 27, 1979) was the seventh bishop of the Episcopal Diocese of Chicago and served from 1941 to 1953.

Education and early career
Conkling was born October 25, 1896, in Matteawan (now part of Beacon, New York), the son of Charles Edmonds Conkling and Susan May Bright. He received his undergraduate degree from Williams College, his divinity degree from Philadelphia Divinity School, and a Master's from Oxford. He taught in seminaries before becoming rector of St Luke's Church in Germantown, Philadelphia, Pennsylvania, his only extended parish ministry before being elected Bishop of Chicago.

His episcopate
During his 13 years as Bishop of Chicago, Conkling worked hard to build missions and to reduce the diocese's indebtedness. Illness forced him to retire in 1953. He was a bishop associate of the Confraternity of the Blessed Sacrament.

Retirement years
After his retirement, Bishop Conkling moved with his wife and their two daughters to Vero Beach, Florida. His wife, the former Constance Lilian Sowby, was born in 1898 in Sleaford, Lincolnshire, England and died March 9, 1969, in Vero Beach. Both were interred on the grounds of All Saints Episcopal Church, Jensen Beach, Florida, where he had served for many years as bishop in residence.

See also

List of Bishops in the Episcopal Diocese of Chicago
Succession of Bishops of the Episcopal Church in the United States

References

External links

Bibliographic directory from Project Canterbury

People from Beacon, New York
People from Vero Beach, Florida
Williams College alumni
1896 births
1979 deaths
20th-century American Episcopalians
Episcopal bishops of Chicago
20th-century American clergy